The California Quake was a women's professional tackle football team based in Los Angeles County, California. The Quake played for 13 seasons in the Western Conference of the Independent Women's Football League. Home games were played at Carson High School. The 2008 season brought new ownership to the Quake; now owned by longtime veteran player, Catherine B. Vivo.

During the California Quake vs New Mexico Menace game on May 24, 2008, kicker Sarah "Ollie" Oliver broke a women's tackle football record by successfully kicking a 44-yard field goal.

On June 7, 2008, the California Quake defeated the New Mexico Menace 35–0, finishing the 2008 regular season undefeated and on top of the Tier 1 Pacific Southwest Division.

Season-By-Season

|-
| colspan="6" style="text-align:center;"| California Quake (WAFL)
|-
|2001 || 11 || 2 || 0 || 1st Pacific South || Won Pacific Conference Semifinal (Sacramento)Won Pacific Conference Championship (Arizona)Won WAFL Championship (Jacksonville)
|-
| colspan="6" style="text-align:center;"| California Quake (WAFC)
|-
|2002 || 5 || 5 || 0 || 3rd Southern || --
|-
| colspan="6" style="text-align:center;"| California Quake (IWFL)
|-
|2003 || 3 || 5 || 0 || 3rd Western Pacific Southwest || --
|-
|2004 || 0 || 8 || 0 || 3rd Western Pacific Southwest || --
|-
|2005 || 6 || 3 || 1 || 3rd Western Pacific Southwest || --
|-
|2006 || 4 || 4 || 0 || 3rd Western Pacific Southwest || --
|-
|2007 || 3 || 5 || 0 || 3rd Western Pacific Southwest || --
|-
|2008 || 8 || 1 || 0 || 1st Western Pacific Southwest || Lost Western Conference Semifinal (Dallas)
|-
|2009 || 4 || 4 || 0 || 3rd Western Pacific Southwest || --
|-
|2010 || 7 || 2 || 0 || 4th Western Pacific West || --
|-
|2011 || 10 || 1 || 0 || 1st Western Pacific Southwest || Won Western Conference Semifinal (Sacramento)Won Western Conference Championship (Wisconsin)Lost IWFL Championship (Atlanta)
|-
|2012 || 3 || 6 || 0 || 2nd Western Pacific Southwest || Lost Founders Bowl Quarterfinal (Portland)
|-
|2013 || 3 || 5 || 0 || -- || Lost Western Conference Semifinal (Phoenix Phantomz)
|-
|2014 || 5 || 2 || 0 || 2nd Western Pacific West || --
|-
|2015 || 1 || 6 || 0 || 5th Western Pacific West || --
|-
!Totals || 73 || 59 || 1
|colspan="2"| (including playoffs)

Season Schedules

2009

2010

References

Official Quake page
IWFL Home Page

Independent Women's Football League
American football teams in Los Angeles
Sports teams in Carson, California
American football teams established in 2001
Women's sports in California
2001 establishments in California